The Division of Moncrieff is an Australian Electoral Division in Queensland.

Geography
Since 1984, federal electoral division boundaries in Australia have been determined at redistributions by a redistribution committee appointed by the Australian Electoral Commission. Redistributions occur for the boundaries of divisions in a particular state, and they occur every seven years, or sooner if a state's representation entitlement changes or when divisions of a state are malapportioned.

History

The division was created in 1984 and is named after Gladys Moncrieff, an Australian singer who resided in the Gold Coast.

Moncrieff is based on Surfers Paradise and the central portion of the Gold Coast.  While the Gold Coast has always been a rather conservative area, Surfers Paradise is considered particularly conservative even by Gold Coast standards.  As a result, Moncrieff has been a comfortably safe Liberal seat for its entire existence.  Indeed, most of the area has been represented by centre-right MPs without interruption since 1906; the Surfers Paradise area was part of Moreton before 1949, and then part of McPherson from 1949 to 1984. The Liberals have never won less than 59 percent of the two-party vote, and since 1993 have usually won enough primary votes to retain the seat without the need for preferences.

It is currently the ninth-safest Coalition seat in Australia and the third-safest for either side of politics in Queensland, with a 17-point swing needed for Labor to win it.

Members

Election results

References

External links
 Division of Moncrieff (Qld) — Australian Electoral Commission

Electoral divisions of Australia
Constituencies established in 1984
1984 establishments in Australia
Federal politics in Queensland
Surfers Paradise, Queensland